Mithila State Movement  is a 300-year-old movement advocating a separate Mithila state in India. This movement gained momentum in 1902 AD when Sir George Grierson, an official of the British Indian government, prepared a map of Mithila state by conducting a language-based survey. In 1881 AD, the word Mithila was added to the dictionary of the British India government. According to the founder, president Dr. Dhanakar Thakur of the International Maithili Council in the proposed Mithila state, 24 districts of Bihar and six districts of Jharkhand, a total of 30 districts, have been included, which has a population of about 70 million. At the same time, the area is 70 thousand square km.

History 
In 1912, when a new Bihar province was separating from the Bengal presidency, the people of Mithila demanded a separate Mithila state based on Sir George Grierson's language-based survey of 1902. But the demand was rejected by the British India government, which stated that in the future, Bihar would be divided into two more states, Odisha and Mithila. In 1921, Maharaja Rameshwar Singh of Darbhanga Raj raised the demand for a separate state of Mithila based on the concept of creating “a series of self-governing provinces and principalities federated by one central government.”   In 1936, Odisha was separated from Bihar, but the demand of a separate Mithila state remained ignored. India became independent in 1947, and from 1950 to 1956 many states were formed based on language, but a separate Mithila state was again ignored. The people of Mithila were aggrieved by this, and by 1950–1952, a movement developed. In 1952, Dr. Laxman Jha launched a major movement for a separate Mithila state. Later he worked only for Mithila-Maithili. Mithila Kesari Late Janaki Nandan Singh raised the demand for a separate Mithila state and expressed opposition in the Congress party in 1954, handing over important documents for a separate Mithila state to the country's first Prime Minister, Pandit Jawaharlal Nehru, in 1956. In 1986, Janata MP Vijay Kumar Mishra revived the old demand for a separate Mithila state comprising the districts of Muzaffarpur, Darbhanga, Saharsa, Purnea, Bhagalpur and more of the district of North Bihar. The revival came in the form of a three-day rail roko agitation organised by him. In March 1996, Mithila Rajya Sangharsh Samiti initiated a mass-contact campaign for the demand of a separate Mithila state, and in the month of July of the same year, Mithlanchal Vikas Congress demanded the formation of an Autonomous Development Council for Mithila. In 2000, Jharkhand was separated from Bihar, but the demand for a separate Mithila state again remained ignored. After the separation of Jharkhand state, the former Advocate General of Bihar, former Chairperson of the Bihar Legislative Council and BJP leader Pt. Tarakant Jha, announced the movement for a separate Mithila state on 4 August 2004 in a press conference. In 2007 he started a signature campaign to demand the creation of a separate state of Mithila for the people who speak Maithili. He said, "We will collect signatures of 10 million people in support of the demand for creation of a separate state of Mithila and submit it to the President of India". After being expelled from the BJP, he continued to advocate the Mithila movement, but as soon as he became a member of the Legislative Council he put the movement on hold. He died in May 2014. In 2008, JD(U) Party's state president Shravan Chaudhary said that his party favored the formation of a separate Mithila state with respect to 18 Lok Sabha and 108 assembly constituencies of North Bihar. According to him, this area is very backward since independence. Every year people of the area face flood situation, and industries in the region are also in ruins. Therefore, the formation of a separate Mithila state is the only solution for the development of this region.  In 2015, Cricketer-turned-BJP MP Kirti Jha Azad demanded a separate Mithila state for Maithils. According to him "Mithila should be a separate state if not a separate country". He raised this issue in the Parliament of India to fulfil the old dream of a separate Mithila state for Maithils in North Bihar. In 2018, former chief minister  and chief opposition leader Rabri Devi favoured the demand of separate Mithila State for Maithili speaking in North Bihar at Bihar Legislative Council.  She demanded with the chairperson of the council to create a separate Mithila state for Maithili-speaking people. The issue was raised after the demand of legal sanctity for the use of Maithili language in official works of the Bihar government by the then BJP MLC Suman Kumar's non-government resolution at the council. In 2019, three BJP leaders, Gopal Ji Thakur MP from Darbhanga,  Ashok Kumar Yadav MP from Madhubani and Sanjay Saraogi MLA from Darbhanga Nagar, raised the demand for a separate Mithila state at 47th Vidyapati festival celebration ceremony organized by Vidyapati Seva Sansthan and held in Darbhanga. They stated that they would take the state of Mithila by violence, as opposed to begging from the government. Akhil Bhartiya Mithila Rajya Sangharsh Samiti had been continuously staging a strike for a separate Mithila state on the first day of every session of the Indian parliament for the previous several years. National President of the Akhil Bhartiya Mithila Rajya Sangharsh Samiti Dr. Baidyanath Chaudhary "Baiju Babu" said that without social, cultural, economic, political and linguistic independence of Mithila, development of the entire Mithila region is impossible. On 18 July 2022, he said that the identity of Mithila is being disappeared in Bihar.  Meanwhile, Mithila Rajya campaigners Pandit Ashok Jha, Praveen Narayan Choudhary, Jayanti Jha, Savita Mishra, Anju Jha and senior campaigners Pandit Harekant Jha said that Mithila has lost momentum and direction due to government negligence.  Education and health standards are falling sharply.  Major demands were put forward during the meeting including separate Mithila state, preservation and promotion of Maithili language, comprehensive development of Mithila and 35-point demands.  Also, permanent solution to floods by building dams in Nepal, AIIMS, IIT, IIM, Doordarshan in Maithili, establishment of IT park, establishment of High Court bench, prevention of migration and unemployment and creation of Mithila Regiment in the Army are prominent.  A memorandum was also submitted to the President, Prime Minister and Home Minister led by Madan Kumar Jha and Hiralal Pradhan. Mithila Student Union is the biggest students union in Mithila region of Bihar. They have started a movement for the separate Mithila state in India from the present Bihar on social media and mass contact campaigns. The organisation had planned a huge public protest on 21 August 2022 at  Jantar Mantar in the national capital of India in New Delhi. The organisation held a huge mass public protest at Jantar Mantar. The public gathering at the protest demanded a separate Mithila state from the present Bihar state in India. In the protest people and young students from different districts of Mithila region arrived to took part in the protest. The non resident Maithils in Delhi also took part in the protest. According to some media reports the protest for Mithila State carried out by the organisation is biggest students protest for the demand of separate Mithila state till now. More than ten thousands of  youths had reached at the Jantar Mantar in New Delhi. Several political figures were also seen at the protest, in which Aam Aadmi Party MLA Rituraj Jha and former MP Mahabal Mishra were prominent. Similarly another mass gathering movement for the separate Mithila State was carried out at Gandhi Maidan in Patna on 4 December 2022 by the volunteers of the Mithila Student Union. The volunteers of the Mithila Students Union (MSU) took out a march to Raj Bhavan in Bihar capital. But the Bihar police stopped the march midway forcefully. The march was called off after the administration took a five-member delegation of the organisation to the Raj Bhavan, which submitted a memorandum to the officials present there. MSU president Amit Kumar Thakur said to media “We have submitted a memorandum at the Raj Bhavan so that our demand could reach the Centre and appropriate action is taken." He further added "According to the Niti Aayog the districts in the Mithila region are among the most backward in the country in almost all parameters. It has been neglected by the ruling parties since Independence,” Another leader Vidya Bhushan Rai told to online edition of The Telegraph that the economy, industries, agriculture, tourism, and education of Mithila region had been exploited and destroyed by the Bihar government. He also said “This despite the fact that it has been a seat of culture since ancient times to the British period. The region can fulfil all requirements to become a separate state, but has been ravaged by floods, poverty, unemployment and migration.” Akhil Bharatiya Mithila Rajya Sangharsh Samiti  has started a footwalk campaign journey from 17th March 2023, which will cover around 700 kilometers in 70 days in the Mithila region. The journey started from Purnia district of the Mithila region. National Spokesperson cum Media Incharge Sushil Kumar Jha of the organisation said "We want a Mithila state.  This will give us two airports, two AIIMS and two IITs.  Similarly with the formation of Mithila state, all facilities like health, education, transportation and roads will start in the region".

Related organisations 
The main role of Mithila State Movement is being done by 'Antarrashtriya Maithili Parishad', 'Mithila Rajya Nirman Sena', 'Sanyukta Mithila Rajya Sangharsh Samiti' 'Mithila Student Union' and The Pro Maithils.

 Akhil Bhartiya Mithila Rajya Sangharsh Samiti was established in 1990. Jaikant Mishra along with Dr Baidhnath Chaudhary "Baiju", Dr Dhanakar Thakur and Amarnath Jha "Bakshi" formed the Mithila Rajya Sangharsh Samiti, so that Mithila State could be created for the people of North Bihar. Jaikant Mishra died in 2009. Presently Dr Baidhnath Chaudhary "Baiju" is the founding member and national president of the organisation. He has been continuously staging strike for separate Mithila state on the first day of every session of the Indian parliament from the last several years. The demonstration is generally organised at Jantar Mantar in the national capital New Delhi. The fundamental agendas of the organisation are creation of the separate Mithila state in the Indian constitution, Maithili should be studied up to primary and secondary level, preservation and promotion of the Mithilakshar script.
 Antarrashtriya Maithili Parishad ( अंतर्राष्ट्रीय मैथिली परिषद् ) was established on June 20, 1993, during the first international Maithili conference at Mecan Auditorium in Ranchi. Dr Dhanakar Thakur is the founder and national spokesperson of the council and Professor Kamal Kant Jha from Jayanagar is the central president of this council.  This council is spread all over India and in 7 districts of Terai region of Nepal. 32 International Maithili Conferences, 7 Provincial Conferences and 80 Maithili Workers Training Camps have been organized by this organization. 25 subunits are working for the central program and expansion of the council. Among them, Mithila Rajya Sangharsh Samiti, Adarsh ​​Mithila Party, Maithili Literary Forum, Mithila Muslim Manch, Yuva Manch, Mahila Manch etc. are prominent. The contribution of this council has been paramount in getting Maithili a place in the Eighth Schedule of the Constitution of India and the second official language to Maithili in Jharkhand. Now the council is actively working on the separate Mithila state formation movement.
 Mithila Student Union is the largest student union in Mithila region of Bihar. It was established in 2015 to improve the education system, employment, migration issues, literacy, condition of health facilities, and scarcity of small-scale industries in the Mithila region. In the earlier years, the organisation demonstrated on the demand for Mithila Development Board. Nowadays the organisation has made creation of separate Mithila state as its major agenda. The organisation has launched hashtag trending for #MithilaRajya on the social medias like Twitter, Facebook etc. #MithilaRajya trended on 4 July 2022 at second position on Twitter by the organisation and people of Mithila. Similarly on 10 July 2022, #CreateMithilaRajya was trended at second position on Twitter. In the leadership of founder member Anup Maithil, the organisation trended #MithilaRajya on the first position on Twitter on 21 August 2022. The organisation also held a huge public gathering protest at Jantar Mantar in New Delhi near the Parliament of India. Anup Maithil said to media that “Bihar is our fake and false identity. We are not Biharis, we are Maithil”.
 Vidyapati Seva Sansthan
 Mithila Rajya Nirman Sena is a social and political organisation which demands a separate Mithila State to be established in the Mithila region of Bihar. It has started a movement known as Mithila Renaissance Journey ( मिथिला पुनर्जागरण यात्रा ) to connect and reorganise the people of Mithila region in Bihar to get support for the formation of the proposed Mithila State in India. It stated on 26 November 2021 in the leadership of General Secretary Rajesh Kumar Jha. The journey is divided into five phases. The aim of the journey is to connect the people of the different parts of Mithila and to propagate the concept of the demand of separate Mithila State. The first target of the journey is to record Maithili as the mother language of the people of Mithila in the upcoming population census of India. The first phase of the journey started from Phulhar village of Madhubani district in Mithila. The second phase of the journey started on 2 January 2022 from the Ugratara Sthan Mandir at Mahishi in Saharsa district of Mithila region in Bihar. The major slogans of the journey were "ले जान कि दे जान" ( take life or give life ) and "जनगणना में मैथिली और संविधान में मिथिला" (Maithili in census and Mithila in constitution). A National Seminar on Mithila State Movement was organized by the Mithila Rajya Nirman Sena in the auditorium of Maharaja Laxmiswar Singh Memorial College on Sunday in April 2022. According to General Secretary Rajesh Jha, the seminar was organized in four sessions. The theme of the first session of the seminar was the condition and direction of the Mithila State Movement. The theme of the second session was cultural integration of the Mithila state. In the third session, the topic of possibilities of economic development of Mithila was discussed.
 Mithila Rajya Sangharsh Morcha
 Maithil Mahasabha was established in 1910 AD by Maharajadhiraj Rameshwar Singh of Darbhanga Raj. He raised the demand of separate Mithila state in 1921 AD.
 Maithili Sahitya Parishad is a social and cultural organisation in the Mithila region which promotes Maithili literature and demand for separate Mithila state. In 2022, a conference was held in the courtyard of Maithili Sahitya Parishad under the chairmanship of Dr. Shankar Jha. Chief speaker Professor Uday Shankar Mishra said that the Mithila movement does not have public support in India and Nepal. Chandresh said that the intellectuals of this place should come forward and go among the general public and explain the justification of separate Mithila state for all round development. Dr. Shankar Jha said that for the Mithila state movement, I will devote my whole body and money to it. Mithila state will be established very soon.
 Akhil Bharatiya Mithila Party

Major demands 
The major demands of the movement are
 Creation of separate Mithila state from Bihar.
 Recognition of Maithili language in Eighth Schedule of the Indian Constitution. This demand was fulfilled by the Parliament of India in 2003. Atal Bihari Vajpayee’s government at the Centre included Maithili language in the Eighth Schedule of the Constitution in 2003.
 The government of Bihar should give the status of second official language to Maithili language in all government works and in all offices in Mithila region. Because only Maithili language from Bihar has been included in the Eighth Schedule of the Indian Constitution.
 Primary and secondary education at schools in the Mithila region of Bihar should be in the mother language Maithili.
 Preservation and promotion of Tirhuta/Mithilakshar script.
 Parmanent solution from the disasters of the every year huge floods in the Mithila region.
 Industrial estates should be built in the region, so that migrations of labours be minimised. Promotion of Agri-based and tourism based industries in the region.
 Formation of two airports, two AIIMS and two IITs in the region for better connectivity, health facilities and education.

Slogans in the Movement 
"Bhik nai adhikar chahi, hamra Mithila Rajya chahi"

"Badd Kelho Upekchhit Bybhaar

Aab naay rahbo Bihar ke Bhaag

Bihari naay Hummy Maithil Chhi

Mithila Rajya Chhai Hummar Maang"

"Sitaram Sitaram,
Swarg se Sundar Mithila Dhaam"

"Maithil karu khoon garam, haq manga mein kon sharam"

"Bihar majboori chhai, Mithila zaroori chhai"

"Le Jaan ki de jaan"

"Ek sankalp dhyan me, Mithila Rajya ho samvidhan mai"

"Janganna mai Maithili Samvidhan mai Mithila"

Industrial ruins in Mithila 
In the earlier period, Mithila was full of industrial estates. There were many industries in the region in regime of Darbhanga Raj Kingdom. These industries were flourishing the economy of the region. After the independence of India, the rule of Darbhanga Raj Kingdom ended and then the industrial estates of the region started gradually closing due to the negligence of the central government as well as state government of Bihar. The region was full of many sugar mills, cotton mills, paper industries, chocolate factories and many more agricultural industries. In the last three decades, due to the castism politics in Bihar by the leaders there, the agenda of industrial development got neglected and gradually industries got closed. Nowadays these industrial estates have become ruins. This led to the migrations of labours and human resources from the area to the metropolitan cities of the country. The sugar mills of Sakari, Lohat, Raiyam and Samastipur was very famous in the country. Mithila was the bowl of sugar in India three decades ago. Hayaghat was famous for Ashok Paper Industry and similarly Pandaul was famous for Cotton mills. Purnea, Saharsa, Katihar, Muzaffarpur and, Darbhanga was famous for Jute industries since 1794 up to 1990.

List of the districts in the proposed state 
Sitamarhi, Madhubani, Darbhanga, Purnia, East Champaran, Muzaffarpur, Saharsa, Vaisali, Madhepura, Jhanjharpur, Begusarai, Munger, Bhagalpur, Samastipur, Sheohar, Supaul, Araria, Katihar, Kishanganj, Banka West Champaran, Khagaria, Jamui,  Lakhisarai, Sheikhpura and some districts of the present Jharkhand. Currently Begusarai is industrial and financial capital of Bihar and economically one of the most prosperous region in Bihar and Mithila region. Muzaffarpur,Darbhanga and Madhubani are the cultural and historical capital of the Mithila. Sitamarhi is the birthplace of Goddess Sita of Mithila. Some scholars claimed Baba Baidyanath Dham as the part of ancient Mithila. According to Ramayana and Mahabharata the entire part of land from North Ganga to Himalaya and Gandak ( Sadanira ) is the part of Greater Mithila Kingdom. The Greater Mithila is also called as Videha in the ancient Vedic texts and Vajjika in democratic Mithila Empire after the end of Janaka period in Mithila Kingdom. In the period of Vajjika League the centre of Mithila was shifted to Vaishali. In this period Buddhism flourished in the region of Vaishali. In the period of Nanyadeva , the centre of Mithila was at Champaran. In the period of Mahesh Thakur, the centre of Mithila was at Madhubani and Darbhanga. The last kingdom of Mithila was Darbhanga Raj Kingdom. This kingdom ended after the independence of India. The Kingdom got merged into the Union of India in 1947 and became the part of present Bihar state demanding the separate Mithila State for Indian part of Mithila.

Tourism in Mithila 

Mithila is the part of Ramayana, Mahabharata and ancient Indian philosophy. Mithila has tremendous opportunity to start up religious tourism in India. There are many ancient sites in the region which has potential for religious tourism to flourish but due to negligence of Bihar government this tourism have not flourished yet. Baliraajgadh is a very ancient site in Mithila but it has yet not been come out on Tourism site by the government there. Rajnagar is a very beautiful city of Mithila. It was built by Maharajadhiraja Rameshwar Singh of Khandwala dynasty of Mithila. The ruins of the Rajnagar Kingdom has a lot of opportunity to start tourism for Film City but it is yet neglected by the government there. Janaki Kund at Purauna Dham in Sitamarhi is the birthplace of Sita. This place has lots of potential to bring Hindu pilgrims from across the world. But the local government has not branded this site as tourist centre, so the site is suffering from negligence.

References 

Mithila
History of social movements
Regionalism in India